The name Nakri has been used to name four tropical cyclones in the northwestern Pacific Ocean. The name was contributed by Cambodia and is the name of a flower.

Tropical Storm Nakri (2002) (T0208, 11W, Hambalos) – brushed Taiwan and Okinawa
Typhoon Nakri (2008) (T0805, 06W, Enteng) – remained out at sea
Tropical Storm Nakri (2014) (T1412, Inday, 12W) – affected the Ryukyu Islands and the Korean Peninsula
Typhoon Nakri (2019) (T1924, 25W, Quiel) – developed west of the main Philippine Islands and made landfall in Southern Vietnam. 

Pacific typhoon set index articles